Scuola Italiana Cristoforo Colombo is an Italian international school in Buenos Aires, Argentina. It includes Kindergarten, primary school, escuela media (junior high school), and liceo (senior high school) levels. It is named after Christopher Columbus.

See also

 Italian Argentine

References

External links
  Scuola Italiana Cristoforo Colombo
  Scuola Italiana Cristoforo Colombo

European-Argentine culture in Buenos Aires
International schools in Buenos Aires
Italian international schools in Argentina
Private schools in Argentina
Secondary schools in Argentina